Godwin is an English-language surname with Anglo-Saxon origins. It means God's friend and is thus equivalent to Theophilus, Jedediah, Amadeus and Reuel.
However, the word "Godwin" can also mean "helper of mankind"

Surname or only known name

House of Godwin

 Ancestry of the Godwins
 Godwin, Earl of Wessex (died 1053), earl in England under the Danish king Cnut the Great
 Harold Godwinson
 Edmund, son of Harold Godwinson
 Godwin, son of Harold Godwinson
 Harold, son of Harold Godwinson
 Magnus, son of Harold Godwinson
 Ulf, son of Harold Godwinson
 Gyrth Godwinson
 Sweyn Godwinson
 Tostig Godwinson
 Leofwine Godwinson
 Wulfnoth Godwinson

Politics and governance
 Abraham Godwin (1763–1835), New Jersey General Assembly 1802–1806, Elector for Andrew Jackson 1828
 Abraham Godwin Jr. (1791–1849), New Jersey General Assembly 1821–1832, took vote to D.C. for Presidential Election 1840
 Hannibal Lafayette Godwin (1873–1929), North Carolina Congressman
 Mary Wollstonecraft, later Mary Godwin (1759–1797), English author of A Vindication of the Rights of Woman
 Mills E. Godwin Jr. (1914–1999), Governor of Virginia
 Richard Godwin (1922–2005), First Under Secretary of Defense for Acquisition, Technology and Logistics
 William Godwin (1756–1836), English political philosopher

Religion
 Godwin of Stavelot, English saint
 Francis Godwin (1562–1633), English bishop and historian
Godwin (bishop), bishop of Lichfield  – 1017
 Jeff Godwin, American fundamentalist, former rock musician 
 Thomas Godwin (bishop) (1517–1590), bishop of Bath and Wells

Arts and entertainment
 Catherine Grace Godwin (1798–1845), Scottish poet
 Edward William Godwin (1833–1886), English architect
 Elizabeth Ayton Godwin (1817–1889), English hymnwriter, religious poet
 Fay Godwin (1931–2005), British photographer
 Frank Godwin (1889–1959), American illustrator, creator of Connie comic strip
 Frank Godwin (film producer) (1917–2012), English film producer
 Gail Godwin (born 1937), American novelist and short story writer
 George Stanley Godwin (1889–1974), English author
 Jeff Godwin, American fundamentalist, former rock musician 
 Joscelyn Godwin (born 1945), English musicologist and translator
 Mary Godwin (artist) (1887–1960), British artist
 Mary Shelley (née Mary Wollstonecraft Godwin; 1797–1851), English author of Frankenstein
 Parke Godwin (1929–2013), American writer
 Parke Godwin (journalist) (1816–1904), American journalist
 Paul Godwin (1902–1982), Polish violinist and bandleader
 Peter Godwin (born 1957), Zimbabwean author and journalist
 Peter Godwin (singer), English new wave musician
 Robert Godwin (born 1958), British author
 Ted Godwin (1933–2013), Canadian artist
 Tom Godwin (1915–1980), American science fiction author

Science
 George Godwin (1813–1888), British architect, town planner and journalist
 Harry Godwin (1901–1985), English botanist
 Henry Haversham Godwin-Austen (1834–1923), English geologist and ornithologist
 Linda M. Godwin (born 1952), American astronaut
 Robert Alfred Cloynes Godwin-Austen (1808–1884), English geologist

Sport
 Billy Godwin (born 1964), American college baseball coach
 Chris Godwin (born 1996), American football player
 John Godwin (baseball) (1877–1956), American baseball player
 Neville Godwin (born 1975), South African tennis player
 Terry Godwin (born 1996), American football player
 Tommy Godwin (footballer) (1927–1996), Irish footballer
 Tommy Godwin (cyclist, born 1912) (1912–1975), English cyclist and world record holder for miles covered in a year
 Tommy Godwin (cyclist, born 1920) (1920–2012), British track cyclist active during the 1940s and 1950s
 Verdi Godwin (1926–2013), English footballer
 Wayne Godwin (born 1982), English rugby player

Military
 Captain Abraham Godwin (1724–1777), Captain of Marines on the USS Lady Washington in the American Revolutionary War
 Bill Godwin, Rhodesian brigadier
 James Godwin, American admiral
 James Gowing Godwin (1923–1995), New Zealand military aviator
 John Godwin (Royal Navy officer) (1919–1945), British Naval Reserve officer during World War II

Other people
 Becky Godwin (1954–1968), daughter of Virginia Governor Godwin, killed by lightning
 Glen Stewart Godwin (born 1958), American murderer, former FBI Ten Most Wanted fugitive
 Mike Godwin (born 1956), American lawyer, created Godwin's law of Internet discussions (mentioning Hitler)

Given name
 Godwin Emefiele, Nigerian banker
 Godwin Igwebuike (born 1994), American football player
 Godwin Olofua, Nigerian badminton player 
 Godwin Samararatne, Sri Lankan teacher

Fictional characters
 Neil Godwin, from The Office

Places
 Godwin, North Carolina
 Godwin-Austen Glacier

Other uses
 General Godwin, convict ship
 "Godwin" (Korede Bello song), a song by Nigerian artiste Korede Bello
 Godwin's law on comparison with Nazis, named after American lawyer Mike Godwin
 Mills E. Godwin High School

See also
 House of Godwin, Anglo-Saxon family
 Goodwin (disambiguation)
 List of Old English (Anglo-Saxon) surnames

English-language surnames